Blackhill Enterprises was a rock music management company, founded as a partnership by the four original members of Pink Floyd (Syd Barrett, Nick Mason, Roger Waters and  Richard Wright), with Peter Jenner and Andrew King.

Blackhill were the organisers of the first Hyde Park free concerts. 

After Syd Barrett left Pink Floyd, the partnership was dissolved, and Jenner and King continued Blackhill to manage Barrett. Following Blackhill's eventual dissolution, both Jenner and King continued to work in music management.

They also managed:
Marc Bolan (who met his wife, June Child, while she was working as Blackhill's secretary)
Edgar Broughton Band
The Clash
Ian Dury
Roy Harper
Alberto Y Lost Trios Paranoias
Kevin Ayers
 Bridget St John
The Action (until they became Mighty Baby in January 1969 and parted company with Blackhill Enterprises).

References 

Music companies of the United Kingdom
Pink Floyd